The Izaak Synagogue, formally known as the Isaak Jakubowicz Synagogue, is an Orthodox Jewish synagogue from 1644 situated in the historic Kazimierz district of Kraków, Poland. The synagogue is named for its donor, Izaak Jakubowicz (d. 1673), also called Isaac the Rich, a banker to King Ladislaus IV of Poland. The synagogue was designed by Italian-born architect Francesco Olivierri.

Legend associated with this synagogue
The founding legend of the synagogue was first told by the early 19th-century Polish rebbe, Simcha Bunim of Peshischa. It went as follows:  "Ayzik Jakubowicz, a pious but poor Jew, dreamed that there was treasure hidden under the old bridge in Prague. Without delay, he made his way there. On arrival, it turned out the bridge was guarded by a squad of soldiers and that digging was out of the question. Ayzik told the officer about his dream, promising him half of the booty. The officer retorted, "Only fools like Polish Jews can possibly believe in dreams. For several nights now I have been dreaming that in the Jewish town of Kazimierz there is hidden treasure in the oven of the home of the poor Jew Ayzik Jakubowicz. Do you think I am so stupid as to go all the way to Cracow and look for the house of this Isaac the son of Jacob?". Ayzik returned home immediately, took the oven apart, found the treasure and became rich. After this it was said: 'There are some things which you can look for the world over, only to find them in your own home. Before you realise this, however, you very often have to go on along journey and search far and wide.' "

Architecture
The interior walls of the early Baroque building are embellished with painted prayers, visible after conservation removed covering layers of paint.  The vaulted ceiling is embellished with baroque plasterwork wreaths and garlands. Before the Nazi occupation of Poland, the synagogue boasted a widely-admired, wooden, baroque Aron Kodesh.  When the building was planned, the design was considered by some diocesan officials to be too beautiful for Jews to have, which led to delays in the synagogue’s construction. Architectural historian Carol Herselle Krinsky considers the Isaak (Isaac) to be "the most architecturally important" of all the old synagogues of Kraków. According to Krinsky, the women's gallery and exterior stairs leading to it are a later addition to the building.

History
On 5 December 1939 the Gestapo came to the Kraków Judenrat building and ordered Maximilian Redlich, the Jewish official on duty that day, to burn the scrolls of the Torah. When Redlich refused he was shot dead.

Nazis destroyed the interior and furnishings, including the bimah and Aron Kodesh. After the war, the building was used by a sculpture and conservation atelier and then by a theatre company as workshop space and for the storage of props. Until recently it was an exhibition space. A fire in 1981 damaged the interior. A renovation was begun in 1983 and in 1989, with the fall of communism in Poland, the building was returned to the Jewish community. It is now a practicing Orthodox Synagogue once again.

See also
 Synagogues of Krakow 
 Remah Synagogue 
 Tempel Synagogue
 Old Synagogue (Krakow)
 Wolf Popper Synagogue
 High Synagogue (Kraków)
 Kupa Synagogue
 List of synagogues in Poland

References

Synagogues in Kraków
Baroque synagogues in Poland
17th-century synagogues
1644 establishments in the Polish–Lithuanian Commonwealth
Holocaust locations in Poland
Orthodox synagogues in Poland